Wallace’s House is an earthen rampart, located near Lochmaben, Scotland, that is associated with William Wallace.

The promontory fort is a scheduled item. The fort is said to have housed a force of men led by William Wallace that harassed the English garrison at Lochmaben Castle during 1297.

References
CANMORE - Wallace’s House

Scheduled monuments in Scotland
Hill forts in Scotland